Shervoni Uvaydoyevich Mabatshoev (born 4 December 2000) is a Tajikistani professional football player who currently plays for Istiklol.

Career

Club
On 19 July 2021, Istiklol announced the signing of Mabatshoev to a two-year contract from CSKA Pamir Dushanbe.

International
Mabatshoev made his senior team debut on 13 December 2018 against Oman.

Career statistics

Club

International

Statistics accurate as of match played 25 September 2022

Scores and results list Tajikistan's goal tally first.

Honours
Istiklol
 Tajikistan Higher League (2): 2021, 2022
 Tajikistan Cup (1): 2022
 Tajik Supercup (1): 2022

Tajikistan
King's Cup: 2022

References

External links
 

2000 births
Living people
Tajikistani footballers
Tajikistan international footballers
Association football midfielders